Géza Varga is the name of:

Géza Varga (director), Hungarian director and academic
Géza Varga (politician), Hungarian politician
Géza Varga (tennis), Hungarian tennis player